Caged Collision  was a professional wrestling pay-per-view (PPV) event produced by Ring of Honor (ROH). It took place on January 31, 2009 at the Frontier Fieldhouse in Chicago Ridge, Illinois, and aired on pay-per-view on April 17, 2009. Nine matches took place the event's card, with seven that aired on the broadcast.

Results

See also
2009 in professional wrestling
List of Ring of Honor pay-per-view events

References

External links
Caged Collision at In Demand.com
ROHwrestling.com

Ring of Honor pay-per-view events
Professional wrestling in the Chicago metropolitan area
2000s in Chicago
2009 in Illinois
Events in Chicago
January 2009 events in the United States
2009 Ring of Honor pay-per-view events